Title 40 of the United States Code outlines the role of Public Buildings, Properties, and Public Works in the United States Code.

 Subtitle I—Federal Property and Administrative Services
 Subtitle II—Public Buildings and Works
 Subtitle III—Information Technology Management
 Subtitle IV—Appalachian Development Act of 1965|Appalachian Regional Development
 Subtitle V—Miscellaneous

External links
U.S. Code Title 40, via United States Government Printing Office
U.S. Code Title 40, via Cornell University

40
Title 40